The Hurricane Canal is a hand-excavated irrigation canal that diverted water from the Virgin River to the east side of Hurricane, Utah, United States.

Description
The  canal was built starting in 1891 and completed in 1904. Work was done by local men, mainly between November and May. The work was paid for by the canal's shareholders, whose lands on the Hurricane Bench were to be irrigated by the canal. The  of new agricultural lands allowed the settlement of Hurricane after 1906.

The work and the shareholder system were organized by James Jepson, Jr. and John Steele. The superintendent of construction was J.T. Willis. Work was hampered by the failure of the first two diversion dams at the Narrows section of the Virgin River. The final dam was a timber crib and boulder structure, later augmented with concrete. From the dam the canal runs westerly  along the wall of the Virgin River Canyon, then south for  along the Hurricane Cliffs to the Hurricane Bench. It passes through twelve tunnels and six flumes. Wood flumes have been replaced with metal, and ten cisterns for drinking water have been abandoned.

The Hurricane Canal was listed on the National Register of Historic Places on August 26, 1977. The canal no longer carries water. A trail now runs along the dry canal. Eleven of the twelve tunnels remain accessible to hikers.

See also

 National Register of Historic Places listings in Washington County, Utah

References

External links

 Hurricane Canal at the Washington County Historical Society
 Canal Trail, Bureau of Land Management
 

Transportation buildings and structures on the National Register of Historic Places in Utah
Canals on the National Register of Historic Places in Utah
Canals opened in 1904
Buildings and structures in Washington County, Utah
Historic American Engineering Record in Utah
Water supply infrastructure on the National Register of Historic Places
National Register of Historic Places in Washington County, Utah
Canals in Utah